The Santa Cruz Cathedral Basilica (also known as  കോട്ട പള്ളി / Kotta Palli) at Fort Kochi, Kochi, is one of the nine basilicas in Kerala. Counted as one of the heritage edifices of Kerala, this church is one of the finest and most impressive churches in India and visited by tourists the whole year round. It is a place of devotion as well as a center of historic significance, endowed with architectural and artistic grandeur and colours of the Gothic style.

The basilica serves as the cathedral church of the Diocese of Cochin.

It was built originally by the Portuguese and elevated to a cathedral by Pope Paul IV in 1558, was spared by the Dutch conquerors who destroyed many Catholic buildings. Later the British demolished the structure and  commissioned a new building in 1887. Consecrated in 1905, Santa Cruz was proclaimed a basilica by Pope John Paul II in 1984.

History

Portuguese missionaries and Santa Cruz Church: 1505–1558 
The history of Santa Cruz Cathedral Basilica begins with the arrival of Portuguese missionaries along with the second Portuguese fleet under Pedro Álvares Cabral on 24 December 1500. The King Unni Goda Varma Tirumulpadu (Trimumpara Raja) of the Kingdom of Cochin received them very warmly. This caused the Zamorin of Calicut to declare war against the Kingdom of Cochin. However, the Portuguese army under Commander Dom Afonso de Albuquerque, who reached Cochin in 1503, defeated the enemies of the King of Cochin and in return he gave them permission to build a fort in Kochi.

In 1505, Dom Francisco de Almeida, the first Portuguese viceroy, received permission from the Kochi raja to build a church edifice using stones and mortar which was unheard of at that time as the local prejudices were against such a structure for any purpose other than a royal palace or a temple. The foundation stone of the Santa Cruz church was laid on 3 May 1505, the feast day of the Invention of the Holy Cross, hence the magnificent edifice when completed was named Santa Cruz. This church was located on the eastern side of the present Children’s Park, Fort Cochin. The basilica hosts the Relic of The Holy Cross of Our Lord Jesus Christ for a long time. This is at the right side of the church.

Raising to Cathedral and demolition: 1558–1795 
In 1558, Pope Paul IV, raised the Santa Cruz Church to the status of a cathedral along with the erection of the second diocese in India – the Diocese of Cochin, suffragan (other being Diocese of Malacca) to the Archdiocese of Goa.

The Dutch, who conquered Cochin in 1663, destroyed all Catholic buildings. Only the St. Francis Church and the cathedral escaped this fate. The Dutch made the cathedral their arms storehouse. Later it fell into the hands of the British who demolished it when they took over Cochin in 1795. One of the decorative granite pillars of the destroyed cathedral is still kept as a monument at the southeastern corner of the present basilica premises.

Erection of the present-day Santa Cruz Basilica: 1886–present 
About 100 years later, Bishop João Gomes Ferreira (1887–1897), a missionary and the Bishop of Cochin, took initiative to re-erect the cathedral and commenced the plan of its construction. However, it was the next bishop, Mateus de Oliveira Xavier (1897–1908), who completed the edifice. The cathedral was consecrated on 19 November 1905 by Bishop Sebastião José Pereira, Bishop of Damao. Considering its antiquity, artistic dignity and historical importance, Pope John Paul II through his decree Constat Sane Templum Sanctae Cruci of 23 August 1984, raised the Santa Cruz Cathedral to the status of a basilica.

The church has two lofty spires and a remarkably bright, white-washed exterior and a pastel-coloured interior. The interiors of the church are mostly Gothic, with the main altar decorated by the famous Italian painter Fra Antonio Moscheni, S.J., and his disciple De Gama of Mangalore. Unfortunately, Fra Antonio Moscheni died here on 15 November 1905, four days before the newly built church was consecrated. The columns decorated with frescoes and murals, the seven large canvas paintings on the passion and death on the Cross, especially the painting of the Last Supper, modelled on the famous painting of Leonardo da Vinci and the beautiful stained glass windows add to the artistic grandeur of the place. The paintings that adorn the ceiling depict scenes from the Via Crucis of Christ.

Priests 
Rector and parish priest
 Very Rev Fr Johnson Chiramel

Assistant parish priests
Rev Fr Chilton George Fernandez
Rev Fr Jerin George Ethothara

Notes

References
 Basilica home page
   www.dioceseofcochin.org – Santa Cruz Basilica
 Giga-Catholic Information
 Catholic Hierarchy
 Ernakulam Archdiocese
 Updated List of Basilicas in India
 Catholic Encyclopedia – Diocese of Cochin
 Diocesan directory | www.ucanews.com

External links

Basilica churches in Kerala
Colonial Kerala
Roman Catholic churches in Kochi
Roman Catholic churches completed in 1905
Religious organizations established in the 1550s
1550s establishments in Portuguese India
Portuguese in Kerala
British colonial architecture in India
Gothic Revival church buildings in India
1505 establishments in Portuguese India
Monuments of National Importance in Kerala
20th-century Roman Catholic church buildings in India